Amin Zendegani is an Iranian actor who started as  king Solomon in the film The Kingdom of Solomon. He also starred in the Persian series Mukhtarnameh as Muslim ibn Aqeel.

Life 
In 1995, he started acting in movies with "Young Advocates" directed by Bahram Beyzai, continuing with "towards victory", "the third path", "the youth age", etc. In 1995 he won the best male actor award in Fajr International Film Festival, and 2001 he was people's favorite actor of TV series. He also appeared in the movie "Mission in Tehran", which won 11 Golden Kolts in the Police Film Festival in Moscow.

Filmography 
 Ferris wheel (2016)
 Mokhtarnameh (2008) as Muslim ibn Aqil
 Kingdom of Solomon (2010) as Prophet Solomon 
 King of Ear (2013)
 Requiem for Dracula
 24 September
 Traveler from India (2001)
 Youthful Days (1999)

References 

Iranian male film actors
Iranian male television actors
Living people
Male actors from Tehran
21st-century Iranian male actors
1972 births